Johann Jakob Müller (4 March 1846 – 14 January 1875) was a notable physiologist and physicist.

Education
In 1868, he obtained his "Dr. med." degree from the University of Zurich, under Adolf Fick with a thesis entitled: Untersuchungen über den Drehpunkt des menschlichen Auges (Investigations into the pivot point of the human eye). As part of these studies he variously studied in the University of Zurich, University of Leipzig, and University of Heidelberg.

Career
In Leipzig, 1870, he became a dozent (lecturer) in physiology. In 1871 he became a professor in physics at the polytechnic institute in Zurich.

See also 
 Alfred Kleiner

References

.

External links
 The Müller archive
 List of ETHZ professors containing Müller
 

1846 births
1875 deaths
University of Zurich alumni
19th-century Swiss physicists